Anand Deverakonda (born 15 March 1996) is an Indian actor who appears in Telugu films. Younger brother of actor Vijay Deverakonda, his films include Dorasaani, Middle Class Melodies and Pushpaka Vimanam.

Early life
Deverakonda was born in Hyderabad of present-day Telangana, India to Govardhan Rao and his wife Madhavi. Govardhan Rao was a TV serial director while Madhavi was a soft-skills tutor. His brother Vijay Deverakonda is also an actor in Telugu films. Anand Deverakonda completed his engineering and was placed in Deloitte. He worked in US for a while and returned to India to pursue a full time career in films.

Career
Deverakonda made his film debut in 2019 with Dorasaani, a periodic love story directed by KVR Mahendra and starring Shivatmika Rajashekar. Although the film didn't do well commercially, Deverakonda went onto win Best Debut Male award at Zee Cine Awards Telugu 2020.

Deverakonda's second feature film, Middle Class Melodies premiered directly on Amazon Prime Video in 2020. Later in 2021, he starred in Pushpaka Vimanam. His next film Highway, directed by K. V. Guhan, premiered on Aha on19  August 2022.

Filmography

References

External links

Anand DeveraKonda at Instagram
Anand Deverakonda at Twitter

Male actors in Telugu cinema
Indian male film actors
21st-century Indian male actors
Living people
Telugu male actors
Male actors from Andhra Pradesh
Zee Cine Awards Telugu winners
1996 births